The following is a list of notable deaths in August 1996.

Entries for each day are listed alphabetically by surname. A typical entry lists information in the following sequence:
 Name, age, country of citizenship at birth, subsequent country of citizenship (if applicable), reason for notability, cause of death (if known), and reference.

August 1996

1
Frida Boccara, 55, French singer, respiratory disease.
Stig Hedberg, 80, Swedish sailor.
Ayo Gabriel Irikefe, 74, Nigerian Jurist and Chief Justice of Nigeria.
Tadeusz Reichstein, 99, Polish chemist.
Lucille Teasdale-Corti, 67, Canadian medical doctor and surgeon, AIDS-related complications.
Charles van Rooy, 84, Dutch politician.

2
Mohamed Farrah Aidid, 61, Somalian military officer.
Brian Briggs, 62, English rugby player.
James Joseph Byrne, 88, American Catholic archbishop.
Michel Debré, 84, Prime Minister of France, Parkinson's disease.
Miguel Alvarez del Toro, 78, Mexican biologist.
Sergey Golovkin, 36, Soviet/Russian serial killer and rapist and last Russian executee, execution.
Alexander Nudelman, 83, Soviet/Russian engineer, aircraft guns designer.
Bob Reinhard, 75, American gridiron football player.
Obdulio Varela, 78, Uruguayan football player.
Kazumi Watanabe, 48, Japanese sport shooter.

3
Guido Alberti, 87, Italian actor and entrepreneur.
Jørgen Garde, 57, Danish admiral.
Dankwart Rustow, 71, American political scientist.
Luciano Tajoli, 76, Italian actor and singer.
Bill Wright, 82, American baseball player.

4
Kiyoshi Atsumi, 68, Japanese actor, lung cancer.
Willard Brown, 81, American baseball player.
Lev Lemke, 64, Soviet/Russian actor.
Vladimir Liberzon, 59, Israeli chess player.
André Trochut, 64, French road bicycle racer.

5
Abdulrahman Mohamed Babu, 71, Zanzibari marxist revolutionary.
Claudio Barigozzi, 87, Italian geneticist and biologist.
Frank Marcus, 68, British playwright.
Havelock Nelson, 79, Irish composer.

6
Muhammad al-Badr, 70, Yemeni imam and politician.
Ossie Clark, 54, British fashion designer, stabbing.
Len Coldwell, 63, British cricket player.
Bobby Enriquez, 53, Filipino jazz pianist.
Gerry Gomez, 76, Trinidad and Tobago football player.
Charles Hadfield, 87, British historian.
Floyd Simmons, 71, American gridiron football player.
Bud Svendsen, 81, American gridiron football player and coach.
Emilio Zapico, 52, Spanish racing driver, aviation accident.
Hernán Siles Zuazo, 82, Bolivian politician.

7
Benjamin Halevy, 86, Israeli politician.
Bill Hanrahan, 77, American broadcaster.
Anne Kristen, 59, Scottish actress, pancreatic cancer.
Herbert Kubly, 81, American journalist.
Loret Miller Ruppe, 60, American diplomat, ovarian cancer.

8
Queta Carrasco, 83, Mexican actress.
Michio Hoshino, 43, Japanese photographer, bear attack.
Herbert Huncke, 81, American writer and poet.
Philip Lucock, 80, Australian politician.
James McLamore, 70, American businessman.
Francesco Molinari-Pradelli, 85, Italian conductor and art collector.
Nevill Francis Mott, 90, English physicist, Nobel prize winner.
Joseph Asajirō Satowaki, 92, Japanese Catholic Bishop.
Julian Stryjkowski, 91, Polish journalist.

9
Tokiharu Abe, 85, Japanese ichthyologist, cerebral hemorrhage.
May Ayim, 36, German poet, suicide.
Lionel Emmett, 83, Indian physician and field hockey player.
John W. King, 77, American politician.
Derek Smith, 34, American basketball player, myocardial infarction.
Frank Whittle, 89, British Royal Air Force officer, lung cancer.

10
Walter MacNutt, 86, Canadian organist, choir director, and composer.
Doris Spiegel, 95, American artist.
Bunleua Sulilat, 64, Thai Buddhist leader.
Rex Tucker, 83, British television director.
Edward Whitfield, 85, English cricket player.

11
Rafael Kubelík, 82, Czech conductor, violinist, composer and director conductor of Czech philharmony.
Kathleen Mills, 72, Irish camogie player.
Ambrosio Padilla, 85, Filipino basketball player and senator.
David Ricketts, 76, British cyclist.
Mel Taylor, 62, American musician, myocardial infarction.
Baba Vanga, 84, Bulgarian psychic, breast cancer.

12
Victor Ambartsumian, 87, Soviet/Armenian astrophysicist.
Robert Gravel, 51, Canadian actor.
Mark Gruenwald, 43, American comic book writer, editor, and penciler, myocardial infarction.
Stephan Kuttner, 89, American legal scholar.
Guy Nosbaum, 66, French rower.
Anthony Parsons, 73, British diplomat, cancer.

13
António de Spínola, 86, President of Portugal, pulmonary embolism.
Richard M. Goodwin, 83, American academic.
Willi Heeks, 74, German racecar driver.
T. John Lesinski, 71, American politician.
Louise Talma, 89, American composer.
David Tudor, 70, American pianist and composer.

14
Sergiu Celibidache, 84, Romanian conductor.
Al Cleveland, 66, American songwriter.
Uzo Egonu, 64, Nigerian artist.
Camilla Horn, 93, German actress.
Tom Mees, 46, American sportscaster, drowned.
Albert Neuberger, 88, British biochemist and academic.
Amrit Rai, 74, Indian writer, poet and biographer.

15
Rey Cuenco, 36, Filipino basketball player, cirrhosis.
Lisskulla Jobs, 90, Swedish actress.
Sven Lasta, 71, Croatian actor.
Tania Leon, 51, South African feminist.
Masao Maruyama, 82, Japanese political scientist.
Albert Osswald, 77, German politician.
Jack Portland, 84, Canadian ice hockey player.
Joe Seneca, 77, American actor, singer, and songwriter, asthma.
George Starbuck, 65, American poet.
Max Thurian, 74, Swiss ecumenical monastic community subprior.

16
Maurice Natanson, 71, American philosopher, prostate cancer.
Miles Goodman, 46, American film composer (Little Shop of Horrors, Dirty Rotten Scoundrels, Teen Wolf), heart attack.
Pino Rucher, 72, Italian musician.
Ediriweera Sarachchandra, 82, Sri Lankan academic and writer.
Sadako Sawamura, 87, Japanese actress, myocardial infarction.

17
E. Digby Baltzell, 80, American sociologist.
Catherine Shipe East, 80, American government researcher and feminist.
Eric Evans, 68, British Anglican priest.
Witold Urbanowicz, 88, Polish flying ace during World War II and general.

18
Al Bertino, 84, American animator.
Geoffrey Dearmer, 103, British poet.
Hugo Gryn, 66, British rabbi, brain cancer.
Charles Mitchel, 75, Irish actor and broadcaster.
Isabel Morgan, 84, American virologist.

19
Tatyana Mavrina, 93, Russian painter and children's writer.
Claire Rommer, 91, German actress.
Guerrino Rossi, 62, Italian football player and coach.
Joffre Soares, 77, Brazilian film actor.

20
Abílio Duarte, 65, Cape Verdean politician.
Les Hart, 79, English football manager.
André-Georges Haudricourt, 85, French academic.
Carlos Jáuregui, 38, Argentinean LGBT activist, AIDS-related complications.
Rio Reiser, 46, German rock musician.
Beverley Whitfield, 42, Australian swimmer, Olympic gold medallist.

21
Mary Two-Axe Earley, 84, Indigenous Canadian women's rights activist, respiratory disease.
Johan Rathje, 80, Danish sailor and Olympian.
Irene Vorrink, 78, Dutch politician.
Richard S. Westfall, 72, American historian.

22
Anandatissa de Alwis, 77, Sri Lankan journalist, marketeer and politician.
Kjell Borgen, 56, Norwegian politician.
Mareo Ishiketa, 79, Japanese composer.
Erwin Leiser, 73, German film director.
Oliver Lynn, 69, American American talent manager, diabetes.

23
Jurriaan Andriessen, 70, Dutch composer.
Jeff Batters, 25, Canadian ice hockey defenceman, car accident.
Gordon S. Brown, 88, Electrical engineering professor.
David Halfyard, 65, English cricket player.
Øivind Holmsen, 84, Norwegian football player.
Audrey Patterson, 69, American sprinter.
Margaret Tucker, 92, Indigenous Australian activist and writer.
Zulfiya, 81, Uzbek poet.

24
Jean Aurel, 70, French screenwriter and film director.
Zainab Biisheva, 88, Soviet/Russian writer.
Eric Heaton, 75, British priest and scholar.
Ben Joelson, 70, American producer and screenwriter.
Hristo Mladenov, 68, Bulgarian football player.
Lev Vlasenko, 67, Soviet/Russian musician.

25
Fred Adison, 87, French conductor.
Erskine Barton Childers, 67, Irish writer, correspondent and United Nations civil servant.
Sylvia Fisher, 86, Australian operatic soprano.
Reinhard Libuda, 52, German football player, cancer.

26
Nikolay Baskakov, 91, Russian Turkologist.
Alejandro Agustín Lanusse, 77, President of the Argentine Republic.
Mario Maskareli, 77, Montenegrin painter.
Khalida Riyasat, 43, Pakistani television actress.
Sven Stolpe, 91, Swedish journalist.

27
Martin Disler, 47, Swiss artist, cerebrovascular disease.
Bert Fortell, 71, Austrian actor.
Abram Games, 82, British graphic designer.
Eliakim Khumalo, 56, South African football player, homicide.
Akiji Kobayashi, 65, Japanese actor, lung cancer.
Agnieszka Kotlarska, 24, Polish fashion model and beauty queen, stab wound.
Greg Morris, 62, American actor (Mission: Impossible, Vega$, The New Interns), brain cancer.
Wayne D. Overholser, 89, American Western writer.
Aliye Rona, 74, Turkish actress, cardiovascular disease.
Yair Rosenblum, 52, Israeli composer, esophageal cancer.
Gordon Stein, 55, American physiologist.
Waldo Rudolph Wedel, 87, American archaeologist.

28
Dulcina de Moraes, 88, Brazilian stage actress and director.
Gevork Kotiantz, 86, Russian artist.
José dos Santos Lopes, 85, Brazilian football player.
Phyllis Pearsall, 89, British cartographer and typographer, cancer.
Marion Stamps, 51, American activist.
Al Zarilla, 77, American baseball player.

29
Norm Bright, 86, American runner, mountaineer, and teacher, pneumonia.
J. B. Jackson, 86, American writer.
Charles O'Neal, 92, American writer.
Tera de Marez Oyens, 64, Dutch composer.

30
Laura Adani, 82, Italian actress.
Modesto Bria, 74, Paraguayan football player.
Alfredo B. Crevenna, 82, Mexican film director and screenwriter, cancer.
Dunc Gray, 90, Australian racing cyclist.
José Toribio Merino, 80, Chilean politician and admiral.
Josef Müller-Brockmann, 82, Swiss graphic designer.
Christine Pascal, 42, French actress, screenwriter and director, suicide.
Goliarda Sapienza, 72, Italian actress and writer, fall.
José Sasía, 62, Uruguayan football player.

31
Richard E. Cross, 86, American businessman, lawyer, and civic leader.
Gil English, 87, American baseball player.
Blaine Johnson, 34, American racing driver, racing accident.
Milt Larkin, 85, American musician.

References 

1996-08
 08